KNUS (710 AM) is a News/Talk radio station licensed in the city of Denver, Colorado. The station serves the Denver/Boulder Metropolitan area. 710 KNUS is owned and operated by Salem Media Group under licensee Salem Media of Colorado, Inc. and features programming from CBS News Radio, Genesis Communications Network, Salem Radio Network, and Westwood One. Studios are located in Aurora and the transmitter is located in Brighton.

The 710 KNUS weekday lineup includes local hosts Peter Boyles, Steffan Tubbs, with Randy Corporon, Mike Boyle, Jimmy Sengenberger, and Matt Dunn handling weekend shifts. 710 KNUS is similar to many of Salem's other talk stations, airing hosts Dennis Prager, Hugh Hewitt, Mark Levin, and Sebastian Gorka. 710 KNUS is a CBS News Radio affiliate and a member of the Associated Press and winner of the Colorado Broadcasters Association's 2018 Best Regularly Scheduled Newscast award.

History of KNUS
KNUS came on the air as KMYR in May 1941 on 1340 kHz. It moved to 710 kHz in April 1956. When it was KBTR, it had a news partnership with KBTV (now KUSA-TV); this ended sometime in the mid-1980s. From the 1970s to the late 1980s, it was owned by Mullins Broadcasting. In the late 1980s, the station changed its name to KBXG when it was bought by a Boulder coal company. In the 1990s, the station was the home of Ken Hamblin, Gary Tessler, Alan Dumas, Carol McKinley, Nia Bender, Pierre Wolfe, Mason Lewis, Warren Byrne, Gabby Gourmet, Ron Krieter, and many others.  At one point in 1991, it had Peter Boyles 5:00 am till 9:00 am, Gary Tessler 9:00 till 1:00. Ken Hamblin 1:00 till 4:00, Jim Turner 4:00 till 8:00 and Jann Scott 8:00 till Midnight. It broadcast from the 23rd floor studios of the Tabor Center.

710 AM would simulcast then-sister KBPI from 1988 to 1989.

In 1993, KNUS was Denver's first station to carry The Rush Limbaugh Show.  When Limbaugh came to Fort Collins for an appearance, thousands of people showed up. Jann Scott also did a live show from Fort Collins where some negative comments were made about Rush. Limbaugh heard the show from his hotel room and came over. Limbaugh and Scott bantered back and forth and then ended up telling jokes and talking to the crowd for two hours.

Former On-Air
Alan Berg, Ken Hamblin, Jann Scott, Marty Nalitz, Jimmy Lakey, Mike Rosen, Alan Dumas, Jim Turner, Gary Tessler, Carol McKinley, Nia Bender, Brandon Scott, Pierre Wolfe, Warren Byrne, Gabby Gourmet, Mason Lewis, Bill Jones, Connor Shreve, Steve Kelley, Krista Kafer, Dan Caplis, Chuck Bonniwell and Julie Hayden, Craig Silverman.

Peter Boyles returned to 710 KNUS in the summer of 2013 after being fired by another talk radio station for racially intensive material.

Chuck and Julie Show controversy

On December 18, 2019 the Chuck & Julie show was cancelled after co-host Chuck Bonniwell stated, when introducing a segment discussing the impeachment of Donald Trump, "You know, you wish for a nice school shooting to interrupt the nonstop impeachment coverage.  " This happened one week after another KNUS host, Kirk Widlund denied allegations that he had posted white-supremacist memes online.

References

External links

 
 Denver Radiog: 80 Years of Change by Tom Mulvey – Advertising & Marketing Review.
 Denver's KBTR/71: "Home of the All Americans" – Denver Radio Memories.

NUS
Radio stations established in 1988
Salem Media Group properties